Kanute Barclay (1936 – June 1994) was a Jamaican cricketer. He played in three first-class matches for the Jamaican cricket team from 1954 to 1962.

See also
 List of Jamaican representative cricketers

References

External links
 

1936 births
1994 deaths
Jamaican cricketers
Jamaica cricketers
Place of birth missing